Karl Schmidt (5 March 1932 – 10 July 2018) was a German international footballer who played as a defender for KSV Hessen Kassel, 1. FC Kaiserslautern and FK Pirmasens.

References

External links
 

1932 births
2018 deaths
German footballers
Germany international footballers
Association football defenders
KSV Hessen Kassel players
1. FC Kaiserslautern players
FK Pirmasens players
People from Schwalm-Eder-Kreis
Sportspeople from Kassel (region)